A squeeze play (or squeeze) is a technique used in contract bridge and other trick-taking games in which the play of a card (the squeeze card) forces an opponent to discard a winner or the guard of a potential winner. The situation typically occurs in the end game, with only a few cards remaining. Although numerous types of squeezes have been analyzed and catalogued in contract bridge, they were first discovered and described in whist.

Most squeezes operate on the principle that declarer's and dummy's hands can, between them, hold more cards with the potential to take extra tricks than a single defender's hand can protect or guard. Infrequently, due to the difficulty of coordinating their holdings, two defenders can cooperate to squeeze declarer or dummy on the same principle.

Context

Complexity
Squeeze plays are considered by many "to be the domain of the experts but many of the positions are straightforward once the basic principles are understood." And according to Terence Reese, the squeeze play "in its practical aspects is not particularly difficult. It takes time, admittedly...and has...to be learned – it cannot be 'picked up'".

Significance and prevalence
Squeeze plays are important in difficult-to-make high-level contracts and in matchpoint play where the taking of one more trick than generally achieved by the field is a real difference-maker likely to result in a top . The opportunity to employ a squeeze play arises sufficiently frequently that it is essential to learn if one aspires to become an advanced player.,

Terminology
 : Cards held by defenders which are winners or protecting winners.
 : Determining or assuming the location of the opponents' cards.
 The : The number of tricks that must be lost before the squeeze can function.
 : To lose the necessary number of tricks.
 Entry: A high card or trump that enables declarer to place the lead in the hand that holds, or that will hold, another card that the squeeze has established.
 : Cards that can safely be discarded by defenders (i.e., are not busy). Rectifying the count removes idle cards from the defenders' hands.
 : Cards held by declarer or dummy which start out as losers, but which may be promoted to winning rank when the squeeze forces the defense to discard its stoppers. 
 Squeeze card: The card which (when led) forces the defense to discard a busy card or cards. Before the squeeze card can bring the squeeze about, several conditions described below must be met.

Conditions

The most basic forms of squeeze require all the following conditions to be in place before the squeeze can operate:
 The defense's guards in the threat suits must be held by one defender only. 
 The count has been rectified which ensures that:
Declarer has enough winners to take all the remaining tricks but one, which is to be gained from the squeeze; and
The defender being squeezed has no idle cards.
 Between them, declarer and dummy have threat cards in two suits that the squeeze may establish as winners:
 At least one of the threat cards must be in the hand opposite the squeeze card; and
 At least one of the threat cards must lie in the hand that plays after the squeezed defender.
 There is an entry to the threat card opposite the squeeze card.

Examples

Classification

There are several ways to classify squeezes:

 According to which opponent can be squeezed:
In a positional squeeze, only one opponent can be squeezed.
In an automatic squeeze, either opponent can be squeezed.
 According to number of opponents squeezed:
In a single squeeze, only one opponent is squeezed.
In a double squeeze, both opponents are squeezed.
 According to number of suits involved:
In a two-suit squeeze, there are menaces in two suits.
In a three-suit squeeze, there are menaces in three suits.
In a compound squeeze, there are menaces in three suits (against one); then, menaces in three suits (against both opponents). It could be named a six-suit squeeze.
The peculiar and rare single-suit squeeze is actually a type of endplay rather than a real squeeze.
 According to what is gained:
In a material squeeze, the opponents are forced to give up a trick directly.
In a non-material squeeze, the opponents are forced to give up strategic position. For example, an opponent can be squeezed out of an exit card or a card that disturbs declarer's entries. An extra trick, however, may materialize later.
 According to the count rectification:
In a squeeze with the count, the count is rectified before the squeeze card is played, and declarer will lose no more tricks. These are typically material squeezes.
In a squeeze without the count, the count is not yet rectified. These are typically non-material squeezes, often with a throw-in in the end position.

Most of the common types of squeezes (and some of the rare ones) have names:

See also
Bridge Squeezes Complete by Clyde E. Love
List of play techniques (bridge)
Vienna coup

Notes

Further reading
 
 
 
 
 
 
 
 
 
 
 
 
 
 
 
 
  Also, 
  / 
 Reese, Terence. Master Play in Contract Bridge
 
 
 Thoma, Peter. The Art of Bridge Squeezes
 

fr:Squeeze#Bridge